Xanthoparmelia plittii is a lichen which belongs to the Xanthoparmelia genus.

Description 
Xanthoparmelia plittii grows to around 4-10 cm in diameter with irregularly lobate lobes which are approximately 0.5-2 mm wide. The upper surface of the lichen is yellow-green with a smooth and shiny surface. While the lower surface being pale or medium brown in color with moderate to densely packed rhizinate anchoring the lichen to the surface.

Habitat and range 
Xanthoparmelia plittii has been observed mostly in North America, but has been found in South America and Europe as well.

Chemistry 
Xanthoparmelia plittii has been found to contain usnic acid.

See also 

 List of Xanthoparmelia species

References 

plittii
Lichen species